Corsarios de Campeche is a Mexican football club that plays in the Tercera División de México. The club is based in Cozumel, Mexico.

See also
Football in Mexico

External links
Official Page

References 

Football clubs in Quintana Roo
Association football clubs established in 1981
Cozumel
1981 establishments in Mexico